Trichothyriopsis is a genus of fungi in the Microthyriaceae family.

Species
As accepted by Species Fungorum;
 Trichothyriopsis alineum 
 Trichothyriopsis juruana 

Former species;
 Trichothyriopsis densa  = Trichothyrium densa, Trichothyriaceae
 Trichothyriopsis sexspora  = Trichothyrium sexsporum, Trichothyriaceae

References

External links
Index Fungorum

Microthyriales